Edward Homer Blaine is a former American Football Guard as well as an honorary professor and investigator from the University of Missouri. He was born in Farmington, Missouri on January 30, 1940. He played offensive guard on the University of Missouri Tigers football team while a pre-med student there. Blaine was named All-Big Eight Conference and All-America in 1961.

Blaine was drafted by the Green Bay Packers in the 2nd round (28th overall) of the 1962 NFL Draft, and was also drafted by the New York Titans in the 4th round (29th overall) of the American Football League's 1962 Draft.

He played professionally in the National Football League with the Green Bay Packers (1962) and Philadelphia Eagles (1963–1966).  He was named All-Pro after the 1964 NFL season. Blaine was inducted into the Missouri Sports Hall of Fame on September 29, 2011.

Blaine is the former Dalton Cardiovascular Research Center Director and continues as a Dalton Development officer and Investigator and Professor in the Department of Medical Pharmacology and Physiology with the University of Missouri. Dr. Ed Blaine was not only successful on the football field but also as one of the nation's foremost pharmaceutical researchers with an interest in hypertension and heart failure.

In November 2009, Dr. Blaine was also recognized as a Distinguished Eagle Scout by the Boy Scouts of America. This recognition is held with other greats such as astronaut Neil Armstrong, former President Gerald Ford, and Secretary of Defense Robert Gates.

References

External links
NFL.com profile
NFL stats

1940 births
Living people
People from Farmington, Missouri
Players of American football from Missouri
American football offensive guards
Missouri Tigers football players
Green Bay Packers players
Philadelphia Eagles players